Dalwogon is a rural locality in the Western Downs Region, Queensland, Australia.

Geography 
The locality is roughly bounded to the north and east by Nine Mile Creek.

The Leichhardt Highway passes through the locality from south-east (Miles) to the north-east (Kowguran).

The land use is predominantly grazing on native vegetation with small amounts of crops.

History 
The line and the station are now both closed. (The spelling of the names of the locality and the railway station slightly differ.)

In November 1917 the Queensland Government offered perpetual leases for town allotments in the Town of Dalwogon.

Education 
There are no schools in Dalwogon. The nearest primary schools are Drillham State School in neighbouring Drillham to the south-west and Miles State School in neighbouring Miles to the south-east. The nearest secondary school is Miles State High School in Miles.

References 

Western Downs Region
Localities in Queensland